This is a list of the main career statistics of tennis player Bob Bryan.

Major finals

Grand Slam finals

Doubles: 30 (16–14)
By winning the 2006 Wimbledon title, Bryan completed the men's doubles Career Grand Slam. He became the 19th individual player and, with Mike Bryan, the 7th doubles pair to achieve this.

Mixed doubles: 9 (7–2)

Summer Olympics finals

Doubles: 1 (1–0)

ATP Masters 1000 finals

Doubles: 59 (39 titles, 20 Losses)

Performance timelines

Doubles

Mixed doubles

ATP Tour career earnings

See also

 Bob and Mike Bryan
 List of twins

Notes

References

Bryan, Bob